Cackleshaw is a hamlet in West Yorkshire, England. The name of the hamlet has been recorded historically as Cackeleshawe, Cackelshay, Cackwelshey and Cockleshaw. This derives from the Old English of kakele (a cackler, or a nickname) and Sceagh, which means copse.

Historically, the main occupation in the hamlet was farming, with much of the land tenanted from the Duke of Devonshire's estate.

Cackleshaw is on the  circular Worth Way walk which starts and ends in Keighley. The walk follows the river and railway first up, then down the Worth Valley.

References

External links

Hamlets in West Yorkshire
Keighley